{|style="background:transparent"
|Note: many unincorporated communities in DeKalb County and Cobb County, Georgia adjacent to Atlanta, including Druid Hills CDP and North Druid Hills, both in DeKalb County and Cumberland, Georgia and Vinings, Georgia, both in Cobb County use "Atlanta" in their postal address but are not part of the City of Atlanta. See DeKalb County and Cobb County, Georgia. Also, an unincorporated area near Norcross, Georgia, located in Gwinnett County, uses an Atlanta postal address, while not being a part of the City of Atlanta.
|}

The city of Atlanta, Georgia is made up of 243 neighborhoods officially defined by the city. These neighborhoods are a mix of traditional neighborhoods, subdivisions, or groups of subdivisions. The neighborhoods are grouped by the city planning department into 25 neighborhood planning units (NPUs). These NPUs are "citizen advisory councils that make recommendations to the Mayor and City Council on zoning, land use, and other planning issues". There are a variety of other widely recognized named areas within the city. Some are officially designated, while others are more informal.

Other areas

In addition to the officially designated neighborhoods, many other named areas exist. Several larger areas, consisting of multiple neighborhoods, are not formally defined but commonly used. Most notable are Buckhead, Midtown, and Downtown. Other smaller examples exist, such as Little Five Points, which encompasses parts of three neighborhoods. Some of these regions may overlap, such as West Midtown, an area which includes several neighborhoods on the west side of the larger Midtown area. 

Some of these areas are connected with community groups such as Midtown Alliance or Community improvement districts (CIDs) such as the Buckhead CID. While those organizations often have an associated definition of the areas they represent, those definitions may not be the same as the common usage. Less formally, some areas of the city are referred to by compass directions, such as Southwest Atlanta.

Neighborhoods (by area)

Intown Atlanta
The term "intown" is historically most commonly used to refer to any neighborhoods close to the central part of the city.

Downtown
Downtown Atlanta n is a neighborhood that contains the following sub-districts:
Castleberry Hill n h
Centennial Hill district
Fairlie-Poplar district h
Five Points district
Hotel District h
Luckie Marietta district
Peachtree Center
SoNo n
South Downtown

Midtown
Midtown, as defined by the Midtown Alliance, consists of these neighborhoods:
The Midtown neighborhood proper which contains the districts:
Midtown Core
Midtown Neighborhood h
Ansley Park
Atlantic Station
Georgia Tech and Technology Square
Home Park
Loring Heights
Sherwood Forest

Westside
Westside or The West Side, is an agglomeration of neighborhoods west of I-75/85 (frequently referred to as the "Connector") and is an unofficial area whose definition varies, and includes:
Berkeley Park
Blandtown
 Western Home Park
Knight Park/Howell Station
Marietta Street Artery
Sometimes Bolton and Hills Park are also included (see below: Northwestern Atlanta)

East Side
Atkins Park
Cabbagetown
Candler Park
Druid Hills (part in Atlanta)
East Atlanta
East Lake
Edgewood
Inman Park
Kirkwood
Lake Claire
Lindridge-Martin Manor
Morningside-Lenox Park
Oakland
Old Fourth Ward
Ormewood Park
Piedmont Heights
Poncey-Highland
Reynoldstown
Sweet Auburn
Scottdale
Virginia-Highland

     

The Little Five Points district is located where Inman Park and Candler Park meet.

Southeastern Atlanta

Amal Heights
Benteen Park
Betmar LaVilla
Blair Villa/Poole Creek
Boulevard Heights
Browns Mill Park
Chosewood Park
Custer/McDonough/Guice
Englewood Manor (AHA property demolished 2008)
Glenrose Heights
Grant Park
High Point
Joyland
Lakewood
Lakewood Heights
Leila Valley (AHA property demolished 2008)
Norwood Manor
Orchard Knob
Peoplestown
Polar Rock
Rebel Valley Forest
Rosedale Heights
South Atlanta
South River Gardens
State Facility
Summerhill
Swallow Circle/Baywood
The Villages at Carver
Thomasville Heights— not to be confused with the former housing project of the same name, located near the neighborhood. (AHA property demolished 2010–11)
Woodland Hills

Southwestern Atlanta

Adair Park
Adams Park
Adamsville
Arlington Estates
Ashley Collegetown (former Harris Chiles)
Ashley Courts
Ashview Heights
Atlanta University Center
Audubon Forest
Audubon Forest West
Baker Hills
Bakers Ferry
Beecher Hills
Ben Hill
Ben Hill Acres
Ben Hill Forest
Ben Hill Pines
Ben Hill Terrace
Boulder Park
Brentwood
Briar Glen
Bush Mountain
Butner/Tell
Campbellton Road
Capitol View
Capitol View Manor
Carroll Heights
Cascade Avenue/Road
Cascade Green
Cascade Heights
Chalet Woods
Collier Heights
Deerwood
East Ardley Road
Elmco Estates
Fairburn
Fairburn Heights
Fairburn Road/Wisteria Lane
Fairburn Tell
Fairburn Mays
Fairway Acres
Florida Heights
Fort McPherson
Fort Valley
Green Acres Valley
Green Forest Acres
Greenbriar
Greenbriar Village
Hammond Park
Harland Terrace
Heritage Valley
Horseshoe Community
Hunter Hills
Huntington
Ivan Hill
Just Us
Kings Forest
Lake Estates
Laurens Valley
Magnum Manor
Mays
Meadowbrook Forest
Mechanicsville
Mellwood
Midwest Cascade
Mt. Gilead Woods
Niskey Cove
Niskey Lake
Oakcliff
Oakland City
Old Fairburn Village
Old Gordon
Pomona Park
Perkerson
Peyton Forest
Pittsburgh
Princeton Lakes
Regency Trace
Ridgecrest Forest
Rue Royal
Sandlewood Estates
South Oaks
Southwest
Summerdale Commons
Sylvan Hills
Tampa Park
Venetian Hills
West End
West Manor
Westhaven
Westview
Westwood Terrace
Wildwood
Wildwood Forest
Wilson Mill Meadows
Wisteria Gardens

Northwestern Atlanta

Almond Park
Atlanta Industrial Park
Bankhead
Bankhead Courts (AHA property demolished 2010)
Bolton
Bolton Hills
Bowen Apartments
Brookview Heights
Carey Park
Carver Hills
Center Hill
Chattahoochee
Dixie Hills
English Avenue
English Park
Grove Park
Harvel Homes
Hills Park
Hunter Hills
Knight Park/Howell Station
Monroe Heights(45)
Mozley Park
Penelope Neighbors
Riverside
Rockdale
Scotts Crossing
Vine City
Washington Park
West Highlands (includes Perry Homes)
West Lake
Whittier Mill Village

Buckhead

Ardmore
Argonne Forest
Arden/Habersham
Brookhaven
Buckhead Forest
Brandon
Brookwood
Brookwood Hills
Buckhead Forest
Buckhead Village
Castlewood
Channing Valley (also includes Memorial Park)
Chastain Park
Collier Hills (also includes Brookwood Hills)
Colonial Homes
East Chastain Park
Garden Hills
Haynes Manor
Historic Brookhaven
Kingswood
Lindbergh/Morosgo
Loring Heights
Margaret Mitchell
Mount Paran/Northside
Mount Paran Parkway
North Buckhead
Paces
Peachtree Heights East
Peachtree Heights West
Peachtree Hills
Peachtree Park
Pine Hills
Randall Mill
Ridgedale Park
Springlake
South Tuxedo Park
Tuxedo Park
Underwood Hills
West Paces Ferry/Northside
Westminster/Milmar
West Peachtree Battle (Known as Wesley Battle by city government)
Whitewater Creek
Wildwood
Woodfield
Wyngate

References

External links

City of Atlanta list of neighborhoods and Neighborhood planning unit|NPUs
List of Atlanta Neighborhood Associations

 
Atlanta